There are several Hindu temples dedicated to Kodandarama or Kothandarama (a depiction of Rama holding his bow). Many temples also include the honorific swamy in their names.

Tamil Nadu 
Kothandaramaswamy Temple, at Rameswaram in the Ramanathapuram District
Kothandaramar Temple, West Mambalam in Chennai
Kothandaramaswami Temple, Nandambakkam in the Kanchipuram District
Kothandarama Temple, Thillaivilagam in Thiruvarur District

Andhra Pradesh 
Kodandarama Temple, Vontimitta, in Kadapa District
Kodandarama Temple, Buchireddipalem, in Nellore District

Karnataka 
Kodandarama Temple, Hiremagalur in Chikkamagaluru district

Hindu temples in India